We Live: The Black Samurai is an EP by American rapper C-Rayz Walz. It was released on Definitive Jux in 2004.

Critical reception
David Jeffries of AllMusic gave the EP 3.5 stars out of 5, saying: "Putting 'EP' on the cover keeps the collection from being over-judged, but hopefully won't keep it from being overlooked." Shawn Lawrence James of AllHipHop called it "a delicious appetizer for those craving food for thought in between his full length LPs." Nick Stillman of Prefix gave the EP a 6.0 out of 10, saying, "We Live shows no evidence of any great progression or downfall from a rapper who, at the very least, is consistently decent."

Track listing

References

External links
 

2004 EPs
C-Rayz Walz albums
Definitive Jux EPs